Copper(II) nitrate describes any member of the family of inorganic compounds with the formula Cu(NO3)2(H2O)x. The hydrates are blue solids.  Anhydrous copper nitrate forms blue-green crystals and sublimes in a vacuum at 150-200 °C.  Common hydrates are the hemipentahydrate and trihydrate.

Synthesis and reactions

Hydrated copper(II) nitrate 
Hydrated copper nitrate is prepared by treating copper metal or its oxide with nitric acid:

Cu + 4HNO3 → Cu(NO3)2. + 2H2O + 2NO2
The same salts can be prepared treating copper metal with an aqueous solution of silver nitrate.  That reaction illustrates the ability of copper metal to reduce silver ions.

In aqueous solution, the hydrates exist as the aqua complex [Cu(H2O)6]2+. Such complexes are highly labile owing to the d9 electronic configuration of copper(II).

Attempted dehydration of any of the hydrated copper(II) nitrates by heating affords the oxides, not Cu(NO3)2.  At 80 °C, the hydrates convert to "basic copper nitrate" (Cu2(NO3)(OH)3), which converts to CuO at 180 °C. Exploiting this reactivity, copper nitrate can be used to generate nitric acid by heating it until decomposition and passing the fumes directly into water. This method is similar to the last step in the Ostwald process. The equations are as follows:
2 Cu(NO3)2 → 2 CuO + 4 NO2 + O2
3NO2 + H2O → 2HNO3 + NO

Treatment of copper(II) nitrate solutions with triphenylphosphine, triphenylarsine, and triphenylstibine gives the corresponding copper(I) complexes [Cu(E(C6H5)3)3]NO3 (E = P, As, Sb).  The group V ligand is oxidized to the oxide.

Anhydrous copper(II) nitrate 
Two polymorphs of anhydrous Cu(NO3)2 are known. The so-called β-form is a covalent molecular complex, as evidenced by its tendency to sublime.  It is one of the few anhydrous transition metal nitrates. It cannot be prepared by reactions containing or producing water. Instead, anhydrous Cu(NO3)2 forms when copper metal is treated with dinitrogen tetroxide:
Cu  +  2 N2O4 → Cu(NO3)2 + 2 NO
The α-form of anhydrous copper(II) nitrate is a coordination polymer.

Structure

Anhydrous copper(II) nitrate

Anhydrous copper(II) nitrate has been crystallized in two solvate-free polymorphs.  α- and β-Cu(NO3)2 are fully 3D coordination polymer networks. The alpha form has only one Cu environment, with [4+1] coordination, but the beta form has two different copper centers, one with [4+1] and one that is square planar. The nitromethane solvate also features "[4+ 1] coordination", with four short Cu-O bonds of approximately 200 pm and one longer bond at 240 pm. They are coordination polymers, with infinite chains of copper(II) centers and nitrate groups. In the gas phase, copper(II) nitrate features two bidentate nitrate ligands (see image at upper right). Thus, evaporation of the solid entails "cracking" to give the copper(II) nitrate molecule.

Hydrated copper(II) nitrate
Five hydrates have been reported: the monohydrate (Cu(NO3)2·H2O), the sesquihydrate (Cu(NO3)2·1.5H2O), the hemipentahydrate (Cu(NO3)2·2.5H2O), a trihydrate (Cu(NO3)2·3H2O), and a hexahydrate ([Cu(H2O)6](NO3)2). The hexahydrate is interesting because the Cu-O distances are all equal, not revealing the usual effect of Jahn-Teller distortion that is otherwise characteristic of octahedral Cu(II) complexes. This non-effect is attributed to the strong hydrogen bonding that limits the elasticity of the Cu-O bonds.

Applications
Copper(II) nitrate finds a variety of applications, the main one being its conversion to copper(II) oxide, which is used as catalyst for a variety of processes in organic chemistry.  Its solutions are used in textiles and polishing agents for other metals. Copper nitrates are found in some pyrotechnics.  It is often used in school laboratories to demonstrate chemical voltaic cell reactions. It is a component in some ceramic glazes and metal patinas.

Organic synthesis
Copper nitrate, in combination with acetic anhydride, is an effective reagent for nitration of aromatic compounds, known as the Menke nitration.
Hydrated copper nitrate adsorbed onto clay affords a reagent called "Claycop".  The resulting blue-colored clay is used as a slurry, for example for the oxidation of thiols to disulfides.  Claycop is also used to convert dithioacetals to carbonyls.  A related reagent based on montmorillonite has proven useful for the nitration of aromatic compounds.

Naturally occurring copper nitrates
No mineral of the ideal Cu(NO3)2 formula, or the hydrate, are known. Likasite, Cu3(NO3)(OH)5.2H2O and buttgenbachite, Cu19(NO3)2(OH)32Cl4·2H2O are related minerals.

 Natural basic copper nitrates include the rare minerals gerhardtite and rouaite, both being polymorphs of Cu2(NO3)(OH)3 substance. A much more complex, basic, hydrated and chloride-bearing natural salt is buttgenbachite.

References

External links
National Pollutant Inventory – Copper and compounds fact sheet
ICSC Copper and compounds fact sheet

Copper(II) compounds
Nitrates
Pyrotechnic oxidizers
Pyrotechnic colorants
Oxidizing agents